Straw  is a colour, a tone of pale yellow, the colour of straw. The Latin word stramineus, with the same meaning, is often used in describing nature.
 
The first recorded use of straw as a colour name in English was in 1589.

Straw in nature

The name of the colour straw is used as an adjective in the names of birds and other animals with such colouring to describe their appearance, including:

Invertebrates
 Barred straw
 Straw underwing

Birds
 Straw-backed tanager
 Straw-headed bulbul
 Straw-tailed whydah

Mammals
 Straw-coloured fruit bat
 Straw-coloured pygmy rice rat 
Other
 Blood plasma is also straw coloured

See also
 List of colours

References

 Your Dictionary: straw-color

Straw
Bird colours